A musician is a person who composes, conducts, or performs music. According to the United States Employment Service, "musician" is a general term used to designate one who follows music as a profession. Musicians include songwriters who write both music and lyrics for songs, conductors who direct a musical performance, or performers who perform for an audience. A music performer is generally either a singer who provides vocals or an instrumentalist who plays a musical instrument. Musicians may perform on their own or as part of a group, band or orchestra. Musicians specialize in a musical style, and some musicians play in a variety of different styles depending on cultures and background. A musician who records and releases music can be known as a recording artist.

Types

Composer

A composer is a musician who creates musical compositions. The title is principally used for those who write classical music or film music. Those who write the music for popular songs may be called songwriters. Those who mainly write the words for songs may be referred to as lyricists.

Conductor

A conductor directs a musical performance; conducting has been defined as "the art of directing the simultaneous performance of several players or singers by the use of gesture". The conductor stands on a raised podium and communicates with the musicians through hand gestures or eye contact.

Performer

Examples of performers include, but are not limited to, instrumentalists and singers who perform for an audience. A musician can perform as a solo artist or as a part of an ensemble (e.g. an orchestra, a choir or a pop group).

See also
 Health problems of musicians
 Lists of musicians
 List of online music databases
 List of highest-certified music artists in the United States
 Record producer

References

External links

 
Occupations in music
Entertainment occupations
Music production